Girl Scouts Korea (걸스카우트) is the national Girl Scouting/Guiding organization of South Korea. It serves 78,365 members. Founded in 1946, the coeducational organization became a member of the World Association of Girl Guides and Girl Scouts in 1957.

Program and ideals
The association is divided in sections according to age:
 Twinkler Scout - ages 4 to 5
 Gaenari (Brownie Girl Scout) - ages 6 to 8
 Jindalrae (Junior Girl Scout) - ages 8 to 11
 Sonyeodae (Cadette Girl Scout) - ages 12 to 14
 Yeonjangdae (Senior Girl Scout) - ages 15 to 17
 Yeongudae (Young Leader (Girl Scout)) - ages 18 to 21
 Seongindae (Adult Troop) - ages 21 and older

There are also Extension Troops for disabled and working girls.

Scout Promise
On my honor, I will tryto do my duty to God and my countryto help other people at all timesto keep the Girl Scout Law.

Scout Law
 A Girl Scout's honor is to be trusted.
 A Girl Scout does her best.
 A Girl Scout takes the initiative in helping others.
 A Girl Scout is a sister to all
 A Girl Scout is courteous and kind.
 A Girl Scout loves nature and respects all living things.
 A Girl Scout keeps the rules.
 A Girl Scout smiles under all difficulties.
 A Girl Scout makes good use of her time and avoids wastefulness.
 A Girl Scout is pure in thought, in word and in deeds.

See also
 Korea Scout Association
 Girl Scouts (film)

References

External links
 Basic English information

Scouting in South Korea
World Association of Girl Guides and Girl Scouts member organizations
Youth organizations established in 1946